David Gene "Dave" Hazewinkel (born September 8, 1944) is an American former wrestler who competed in the 1968 Summer Olympics and in the 1972 Summer Olympics. Born in Detroit, Michigan, he is the twin brother of James Hazewinkel and father of Sam Hazewinkel.

He was a bronze medalist in Brazil at the 1969 World Championships and a silver medalist in Canada at the 1970 World Championships. Hazewinkel was the first American to win a silver medal at the World Championships in Greco-Roman wrestling, the first American to win two world medals in Greco-Roman, and the first American to win two consecutive World medals in Greco-Roman.

His son Sam Hazewinkel was also an Olympic wrestler, making them the first father and son to each make the U.S. Olympic team.

References

1944 births
Living people
Sportspeople from Detroit
Olympic wrestlers of the United States
Wrestlers at the 1968 Summer Olympics
Wrestlers at the 1972 Summer Olympics
American male sport wrestlers
Twin sportspeople
American twins